Pseudabryna is a genus of longhorn beetles of the subfamily Lamiinae, containing the following species:

 Pseudabryna hieroglyphica Schultze, 1934
 Pseudabryna luzonica Schultze, 1916

References

Pteropliini